Bretzia nebrascensis was an extinct species of deer that lived in North America (Nebraska, South Dakota) during the Pleistocene and Early Holocene, as recently as 10,000 BP.

The antlers of B. nebrascensis were noticeably different from those of its earlier relative, Bretzia pseudalces, primarily in the height of antler beams from burr to brow tines, and the absence of a beaded burr.

References

Capreolinae
Prehistoric deer
Prehistoric mammals of North America
Pleistocene even-toed ungulates
Pleistocene mammals of North America
Holocene extinctions